West Shillong is one of the 60 Legislative Assembly constituencies of Meghalaya state in India. It is part of East Khasi Hills district. It falls under Shillong Lok Sabha constituency and its current MLA is Paul Lyngdoh of United Democratic Party.

Members of Legislative Assembly
The list of MLAs are given below

|-style="background:#E9E9E9;"
!Year
!align="center" |Name
!colspan="2" align="center"|Party
|-
|2013
| Paul Lyngdoh
|
|-
|2018
|Mohendro Rapsang
|
|-
|2023
|Paul Lyngdoh
|
|-
|}

Election results

2018

See also
List of constituencies of the Meghalaya Legislative Assembly
Shillong (Lok Sabha constituency)
East Khasi Hills district

References

Assembly constituencies of Meghalaya
East Khasi Hills district